Stampa Barbara was a store in Santa Barbara, California that focused exclusively on rubber stamps. Opened in 1985, by Gary Dorothy, the store was the first of its kind. The store created their own designs, as well as selling several other companies stamps. Stampa Barbara would open a second location in 1992 on Melrose, in Los Angeles. Gary Dorothy closed the store and sold his remaining inventory to Clearsnap in 1999, but would continue to make and sell stamps online.

References

Shops in the United States
American companies established in 1985
Retail companies established in 1985
Arts and crafts retailers
1985 establishments in California